Ancient Kyiv is a historic preserve of the Kyiv city, Ukraine. The preserve is a complex of landmarks located majorly in area of the Kyiv city Podil district and stretching onto part of the Upper city known as Honchari-Kozhumiaky (Potters-Tanners).

Created in 1987, the borders of the preserve were established by the Kyiv city administration (Executive Committee) in 1988. All its components were official registered in the Registry of National Landmarks.

List of landmarks
 Ensemble of the Saint Ilya Church (17th - 18th century)
 Church building
 Belfry
 Gate and walls
 Minor Seminary
 Ensemble of the Fraternal Monastery (17th - 19th century)
 Old Academic Building
 New Academic Building
 Refectory with the Church of Holy Spirit
 Sundial
 Kitchen with cells
 Cells
 Prosphora factory
 Hegumen buildingdffffc* Seminary
 Ensemble of the Florivsky Convent
 Church of the Ascension
 Belfry
 Refectory Church
 Hegumen building
 Church of Nicholas the Embankment
 Church of Nicholas the Impressive
 Belfry of Nicholas the Good Church
 Academy of Visual Art and Architecture building (former Theological Seminary)
 Building of a Postal Station
 Old Building of Contracts
 Building of Contracts
 Magdeburg Right Column
 Prince Vladimir the Great monument
 six residential buildings (various locations)
 Store
 Granary
 College
 Intercession Church
 Intercession Monastery
 St Nicholas Cathedral
 Temple of the Intercession
 Refectory of the Michael's Golden-Domed Monastery

Rebuilt landmarks of architecture
 St. Michael's Golden-Domed Monastery
 Michael's Golden-Domed Cathedral
 Belfry
 Church Assumption of Our Lady Pirogoscha
 Fountain of Samson
 Church of the Nativity

See also
 Golden Gate, Kyiv

External links
 State Historic Preserve Ancient Kyiv

Tourist attractions in Kyiv
Landmarks in Kyiv
Historic sites in Ukraine